Hari-Bhari (Fertility) is a 2000 Hindi film by Shyam Benegal, starring Shabana Azmi, Rajit Kapur, Rajeshwari Sachdev, Surekha Sikri and  Nandita Das in the lead roles.

The film revolves around the story of five women, belonging to different generations, each looking emancipation and the right to run their lives their own way. The film's main theme is the issue of women's 'fertility rights' empowerment.

The film won the 2000 National Film Award for Best Film on Family Welfare.

Plot

The movie tells the story of a middle aged Muslim woman Gazala (Shabana Azmi), who is ill-treated by her husband and sent back to her parents’ home, just because she is unable to give birth to a son.  Gazala does have a daughter Salma (Rajeshwari Sachdev). The plot revolves around Gazala's stay at her mother's home and the problems faced by the women of the house, namely her mother and sisters-in-law. The film is a beautiful description of the problems faced by women in the name of fertility, or in a different sense the urge to have a male child, especially in rural India.

Shyam Benegal provides a masterpiece, reflecting on the sorrowful plight of rural Indian women. The irony lies in the point where the movie begins with a scene which shows a bull being brought to impregnate a buffalo. Five different women, each with a different story depicting the harsh realities of a woman's life.

Cast
 Shabana Azmi as Ghazala
 Rajit Kapur as Khurshid
 Rajeshwari Sachdev as Salma
 Surekha Sikri as Hasina
 Nandita Das as Afsana
 Seema Bhargava as Rampyari
 Lalit Tiwari as Khaleej

References

External links
 
 Shyam Benegal interview on Hari-Bhari at Rediff.com.

2000 films
2000s Hindi-language films
Films directed by Shyam Benegal
Films about women in India
Reproductive rights
Indian feminist films
Women's rights in India
Best Film on Family Welfare National Film Award winners